"Frozen" is a song by American rapper Lil Baby, released on April 29, 2022 by Quality Control Music and Motown. It was produced by Ant Chamberlain and STG Beats.

Background
The song leaked online on December 25, 2021. Subsequently, fans expected that it would be officially released. On April 29, 2022, Lil Baby released the song and announced it on Instagram, writing, "I Hate This Song Got Leaked But This Bitch So Hard I Still Dropped It".

Composition
The song is built on a "melancholic" piano loop that is accompanied with "cymbal ticks and handclaps". Lyrically, it sees Lil Baby reflecting on his fame and success as a rapper, especially the aspects of which that bring stress to him, and singing about his determination to overcome them.

Charts

References

2022 singles
2022 songs
Lil Baby songs
Songs written by Lil Baby
Motown singles